Italy participated in the Junior Eurovision Song Contest 2018 which took place on 25 November 2018 in Minsk, Belarus. The Italian broadcaster Rai Gulp, which is a channel owned by Radiotelevisione Italiana (RAI), was responsible for organising their entry for the contest. Melissa and Marco were internally selected to represent Italy with the song "What Is Love", which finished seventh with 151 points at the event, receiving the top 12 points from the Macedonian jury and a cumulative 57 points through online voting.

Background

Before Junior Eurovision
The Italian broadcaster announced on 26 June 2018, that they would be participating at the contest which takes place on 25 November 2018, in Minsk, Belarus. The method for selecting their entrant and song was done internally by the national broadcaster, RAI. On 9 October 2018, it was announced that Melissa di Pasca (born 18 July 2008) and Marco Boni (born 17 August 2004) would be representing Italy at the contest with the song "What Is Love".

At Junior Eurovision
During the opening ceremony and the running order draw which both took place on 19 November 2018, Italy was drawn to perform eleventh on 25 November 2018, following Serbia and preceding Australia.

Voting

Detailed voting results

References

Italy
Junior
Junior Eurovision Song Contest